Government Plates is the third studio album by experimental hip hop group Death Grips. It was released for free download on November 13, 2013. It was also uploaded by the band to multiple file sharing sites, and music videos for every song were uploaded to the band's YouTube page. On January 14, 2014, Government Plates was made available for purchase through iTunes. The album has sold 13,000 copies as of March 2015.

Background
On May 10, 2013, it was announced that Death Grips drummer Zach Hill was working on a third Death Grips studio album while writing, directing, and scoring a film. On July 8, it was announced that Death Grips had launched their own record label, Third Worlds. The label was created through "a unique relationship with Harvest/Capitol" with a deal to be distributed by Caroline Records. It was also revealed that the album would be released the following year. On August 21, the album's only single "Birds" was made available for free download. The song is notably built around a heavily edited sample of a guitar riff played by English actor Robert Pattinson, who used Hill's iPhone to record it.

Release
On November 13, 2013, Death Grips posted Government Plates on several websites for free download without any forewarning. Subsequently, they released music videos for all eleven tracks on YouTube and streamed the full album on  SoundCloud. The album was released exactly 13 months, 13 days, and 13 hours after their previous album, No Love Deep Web. The album was released to iTunes and Spotify on January 14, 2014.

On November 28, 2014, 900 vinyl copies of Government Plates were released for Record Store Day Black Friday, containing new artwork and a physical replica of the license plate on the cover.

Critical reception

Upon its release, Government Plates was met with generally positive reviews. At Metacritic the album received an average score of 75, which indicates "generally favorable", based on 18 reviews. Ian Cohen of Pitchfork awarded the album "Best New Music", writing: "Government Plates loudly reestablishes Death Grips as a group freed by having no ideals whatsoever, making music without a past about a present with no future." Chase Woodruff of Slant Magazine gave the album a positive review, stating: "Government Plates doesn't budge an inch from the vulgar, militant nihilism of 2012's The Money Store or its follow-up, No Love Deep Web." Joe Price of This Is Fake DIY referred to the album as "a sloppy lobotomy of hip-hop focused on provoking fear and intrigue."

The album was placed at 43 on Spins 50 Best Albums of 2013 list.

However, some critics criticized "the lack of vocals" in the album. Consequence of Sound senior staff writer Dan Caffrey stated: "Although MC Ride’s presence is definitely felt, it’s more in repeated phrases and abstract vocalizations than the nasty stream-of-consciousness rhymes from other Death Grips releases."

In other media
"You Might Think He Loves You for Your Money but I Know What He Really Loves You for It’s Your Brand New Leopard Skin Pillbox Hat" was featured in a 2014 commercial for the Intersport shoe line.

Track listing

Personnel
Death Grips
 MC Ride – vocals, production
 Zach Hill – production, drums
 Andy Morin – production, keyboards, programming

Additional musicians
 Robert Pattinson – guitar on "Birds"

References

External links

2013 albums
Death Grips albums
Albums free for download by copyright owner
Harvest Records albums